The 1995 Asian Badminton Championships was the 14th edition of the Badminton Asia Championships. It was held in Olympic Sports Center Gymnasium, Beijing, China, from 4 to 8 April. China finished with three titles; while South Korea won men's singles and Malaysia won men's doubles disciplines.

Medalists

Medal table

Final Results

Men's singles

Women's singles

Men's doubles

Women's doubles

Mixed doubles

See also
 Medalists at the Badminton Asia Championships

References 

Badminton Asia Championships
Asian Badminton Championships
1995 Asian Badminton Championships
Badminton Asia Championships
Badminton Asia Championships